Otto Knerr (January 16, 1883 – March 31, 1960) was an American gymnast. He competed in three events at the 1904 Summer Olympics.

References

1883 births
1960 deaths
American male artistic gymnasts
Olympic gymnasts of the United States
Gymnasts at the 1904 Summer Olympics
Sportspeople from Illinois